Broadland is a local government district in Norfolk, England.

Broadland or Broadlands may also refer to:

Broadland (UK Parliament constituency), a parliamentary constituency in Norfolk, England
Broadland, South Dakota, a town in Beadle County, South Dakota, United States
The Broads, Norfolk and Suffolk, England
Broadlands, an English country house in Hampshire
Broadlands, Devon, an area in Newton Abbott, Devon, England
Broadlands, Illinois, a village in Champaign County, Illinois, United States
Broadlands, a townland in Ireland, see List of townlands of County Mayo
Broadlands, New Zealand, in Rotorua Lakes District
Broadlands, Victoria, in the Shire of East Gippsland, Australia
Broadlands, Virginia, a census-designated place in Loudoun County, Virginia, United States